Simba Technologies Inc. is a software company based in Vancouver, British Columbia, Canada. Simba specializes in products for ODBC, JDBC, OLE DB for OLAP (ODBO) and XML for Analysis (XMLA). The company licenses data connectivity technologies, and provides software development for  Microsoft Windows, Linux, UNIX, Mac and mobile device platforms. Simba Technologies was founded as PageAhead Software in Vancouver and Seattle, Washington in 1991 and changed its name in 1995. Customers include Microsoft, Oracle Corporation, MIS AG, SAP AG and Descisys.

Products
Simba's products include a JDBC/ODBC SDK, an OLAP/ODBO/XMLA SDK, a SQL to MDX adaptor, an ODBO to XMLA bridge, and MDX Provider for Oracle OLAP, and other data connectivity products.

Services 

 Integration Services
 OEM Development
 Certification & Testing - work with Tableau Software®

History
PageAhead Software co-developed the first standards based ODBC driver with Microsoft in 1992, Simba.DLL. The first ODBC driver was included in Microsoft Windows 3.1, and has since been installed on over 30 million computers. ODBC is a widely used data access interface for relational database management systems RDBMS. DEC and Oracle licensed Simba products in 1993. In 1994, Attachmate, Liant and PageAhead jointly developed a product that would allow Attachmate to use PageAhead's SDK products to build their original QuickDB server.

In 1993, the company was the first to introduce an ODBC Software Development Kit SDK to build custom ODBC drivers allowing users to use standard-compliant Business Intelligence BI applications and platforms, such as PowerBI, Microsoft Excel, Tableau, Alteryx and SAP BusinessObjects for analysis and reporting.

In 2012 Simba Technologies developed an ODBC driver for Hadoop/Hive Big Data sources. The ODBC 3.52 driver enables users to directly access and analyse Big Data sources, using the BI tool of their choice.

Timeline

1991 - PageAhead Software is founded in Vancouver, British Columbia and Seattle, Washington
1992 - Microsoft partners with PageAhead to develop Simba ODBC
1993 - Microsoft puts Simba technology on 30 million desktops
1993 - Digital and Oracle partner with PageAhead
1993 - First to ship complete software development kits for ODBC drivers
1994 - Attachmate, Liant and PageAhead create legacy data product. PageAhead focuses on connectivity solutions
1995 - PageAhead Software changes its name to Simba Technologies; Develops server-based ODBC for the UNIX market 
1996 - 100th customer signed
1997 - The first "100% Pure Java" JDBC driver created
1998 - The first to deliver native OLE DB and OLE DB for OLAP (ODBO) toolkits
1999 - Host and sponsor of the first-ever industry event InterOperate '99 in which, 16 OLAP server and application vendors performed interoperability testing, technical and marketing brainshare
1999 - Appointed Chair of the MDX Conformance SIG of the Analytical Solutions Forum (ASF)
2000 - SimbaEngine SDK 5.5 and SimbaProvider for OLAP SDK 2.0 released
2000 - Simba and Orbital Technologies Inc. form an alliance
2001 - SimbaEngine SDK 6.0 and SimbaEngine SDK 6.1 released
2001 - SimbaLab is launched following InterOperate '99
2002 - SimbaEngine SDK 6.2 and SimbaProvider for OLAP SDK 2.5 released
2002 - Partners with Microsoft and Hyperion on XML for Analysis
2002 - XML for Analysis InterOperate Workshop hosted
2003 - SimbaEngine SDK 7.0 and SimbaProvider SDK 3.0 released
2003 - XML for Analysis InterOperate Workshop II hosted
2004 - SimbaEngine SDK 7.2, SimbaEngine SDK 7.3 and SimbaProvider SDK 3.1 released
2005 - SimbaEngine SDK 7.4 released
2006 - SimbaProvider SDK 3.5 and SimbaEngine SDK 7.5 released
2007 - SimbaEngine SDK 7.5.2, SimbaLib SDK 8.0, SimbaProvider SDK 4.0 and SimbaProvider SDK 4.1 released. SimbaProvider SDK 4.0 includes the only MDX 2005 language compliant engine and parser outside of Microsoft. Simba's MDX 2005 technology is licensable for connectivity to multi-dimensional products from companies like Microsoft.
2008 - SimbaEngine SDK 7.6 released
2009 - Simba releases MDX Provider for Oracle OLAP, SimbaEngine SDK 8.0, SimbaEngine SDK 7.7, SimbaProvider SDK 4.2 and Simba ODBC Driver for Microsoft HealthVault
2010 - Simba releases SimbaEngine SDK 8.0.2 and SimbaProvider SDK 4.3 and SimbaO2X 4.3. Simba's MDX Provider for Oracle OLAP product receives TIA Award for Excellence in Product Innovation. Simba releases MDX Provider for Oracle OLAP 2.0
2011 - Simba releases SimbaEngine SDK 8.1 and SimbaProvider SDK 4.4
2012 - Simba releases SimbaEngine SDK 9 and ODBC 3.52 driver for Hadoop/Hive
2014 - Simba releases World’s First Big Data ODBC Drivers for Mac
2016 - Simba releases SimbaEngine X SDK featuring a new generation of client and server with 10X data throughput improvement
2016 - Magnitude Software acquires Simba

References

Software companies of Canada
Companies based in Vancouver